Harrison Township is one of the twelve townships of Vinton County, Ohio, United States.  The 2010 census found 1,068 people in the township.

Geography
Located in the southwestern corner of the county, it borders the following townships:
Eagle Township: north
Jackson Township: northeast corner
Richland Township: east
Jackson Township, Jackson County: south
Liberty Township, Ross County: southwest
Jefferson Township, Ross County: northwest

Harrison Township lies farther west than any other location in Vinton County.

No municipalities are located in Harrison Township, although the unincorporated community of Ray lies in the township's southeast.

Name and history
It is one of nineteen Harrison Townships statewide.

Government
The township is governed by a three-member board of trustees, who are elected in November of odd-numbered years to a four-year term beginning on the following January 1. Two are elected in the year after the presidential election and one is elected in the year before it. There is also an elected township fiscal officer, who serves a four-year term beginning on April 1 of the year after the election, which is held in November of the year before the presidential election. Vacancies in the fiscal officership or on the board of trustees are filled by the remaining trustees.

References

External links
Vinton County Chamber of Commerce 

Townships in Vinton County, Ohio
Townships in Ohio